Teodor Axentowicz (Armenian: Թեոդոր Աքսենտովիչ; 13 May 1859 in Brașov, Austrian Empire – 26 August 1938 in Kraków, Second Polish Republic) was a Polish-Armenian painter and university professor. A renowned artist of his times, he was also the rector of the Academy of Fine Arts in Kraków. As an artist, Axentowicz was famous for his portraits and subtle scenes of Hutsul life, set in the Carpathians.

Life
Axentowicz was born on 13 May 1859 in Brașov, Hungary (now Romania), to a family of Polish-Armenian ancestry. In 1893 in Chelsea, London, he married Iza Henrietta Gielgud, aunt of Val Gielgud and John Gielgud of the theatrical dynasty. A son, Philip S.A.D. Axentowicz, was born in Chelsea in 1893.

Between 1879 and 1882 he studied at the Academy of Fine Arts in Munich. From there he moved to Paris, where he was a student of Carolus-Duran and continued his education until 1895. During that time he started a long-time cooperation with various journals and started his career as a copyist, duplicating the works of Tizian and Botticelli for Le Monde illustré. He also made numerous travels to London and Rome, where he prepared a set of portraits, one of the first in his career.

In 1894 he started collaboration with Wojciech Kossak and Jan Styka during the preparation of the Racławice Panorama, one of the largest panoramic paintings in the history of Polish art. The following year he moved to Kraków, where he became a professor at the local Academy of Fine Arts. He was also active in the local society and cooperated with various societies devoted to propagation of arts and crafts. In 1897 he founded an artistic conservatory for women and soon afterwards became one of the founders of the Sztuka society, whose members were such artists as Józef Chełmoński, Julian Fałat, Jacek Malczewski, Józef Mehoffer, Jan Stanisławski, Włodzimierz Tetmajer, Leon Wyczółkowski and Stanisław Wyspiański. In 1910 he became the rector of the Academy and since 1928 was also an honorary member of the Zachęta Society. He died on 26 August 1938 in Kraków.

Throughout his life he had numerous exhibitions, both in Poland and abroad. He was awarded many gold metals at both national and international exhibitions. The most notable were organized in: Berlin (1896, 1913), St. Louis (1904), Munich (1905, 1935), London (1906), Vienna (1908), Rome (1911), Venice (1914, 1926), Paris (1921), Chicago (1927), and Prague (1927). His paintings can be found in almost all public collections in Poland and in numerous private ones there and abroad.

In 1904 at the St. Louis World's Fair, Axentowicz received a Special Commemorative Award in recognition of distinguished service in connection with various national sections of the Department of Art.

While in Paris, he received the prestigious title of Officier d'Académie Ordre des Palmes académiques and Member of Académie des Beaux-Arts.
 
In addition to Society of Polish Artists "Sztuka", he was also a member of Hagenbund and a founding member of the Vienna Secession.

Awards
 1909, knighted by Franz Joseph I of Austria to Order of the Iron Crown (Austria).
 1923, the Commander's Cross with Star of the Order of Merit of the Republic of Poland.
 1929, Medal of the Decade by the Second Polish Republic.
 1929, the Grand Gold Metal at the Universal Exhibition in Poznań.
 1936, Order of Polonia Restituta.

See also
 List of Poles (visual arts)

References

External links 

 Paintings
 Biography

1859 births
1938 deaths
19th-century Polish painters
19th-century Polish male artists
20th-century Polish painters
20th-century Polish male artists
Ethnic Armenian painters
Polish people of Armenian descent
Hungarian people of Armenian descent
Academy of Fine Arts, Munich alumni
People from Brașov
Burials at Rakowicki Cemetery
Members of the Vienna Secession
Polish male painters